Edmonton-Rutherford is a provincial electoral district in Alberta, Canada. The district is mandated to return a single member to the Legislative Assembly of Alberta using the first past the post method of voting.

The district was created in the boundary redistribution of 1993 from the Edmonton-Whitemud riding in South Edmonton. The district is a swing riding and has regularly changed between Liberal and Progressive Conservative control. It was named after former Premier Alexander Rutherford who represented the Strathcona constituency after the province was formed in 1905. the old Strathcona district included what is now Edmonton Rutherford.

History
The electoral district was created in the 1993 boundary redistribution out of Edmonton-Whitemud.

The district saw minor changes in the 2010 redistribution. It gained some land that was part of Edmonton-Whitemud on its western boundary when the boundary was moved west from 119 Street to Whitemud Creek.

Boundary history

Electoral history

The electoral district was created in the boundary redistribution in 1993 from Edmonton-Whitemud riding. The first election in 1993 saw Edmonton-Whitemud incumbent Percy Wickman pickup the new district for the Liberal party with a very large majority. Wickman was re-elected in a tight race in the 1997 general election. He retired at the end of his third term in 2001 due to health issues.

The 2001 general election saw former Member of Parliament Ian McClelland pickup the district for the first time for the Progressive Conservatives. He defeated Liberal candidate Rick Miller in a hotly contested race.

McClelland and Miller would face each other for the second time in the 2004 general election. This time Miller would gain significant share of the popular vote to defeat McClelland.

Miller would only last a single term in office, he ran for re-election in 2008 but was defeated in a very close race by Progressive Conservative candidate Fred Horne.

Legislature results

1993 general election

1997 general election

2001 general election

2004 general election

2008 general election

2012 general election

2015 Alberta general election

2019 Alberta general election

Graphical representation

Senate nominee results

2004 Senate nominee election district results

Voters had the option of selecting 4 Candidates on the Ballot

2012 Senate nominee election district results

Student Vote results

2004 election

On November 19, 2004 a Student Vote was conducted at participating Alberta schools to parallel the 2004 Alberta general election results. The vote was designed to educate students and simulate the electoral process for persons who have not yet reached the legal majority. The vote was conducted in 80 of the 83 provincial electoral districts with students voting for actual election candidates. Schools with a large student body that reside in another electoral district had the option to vote for candidates outside of the electoral district then where they were physically located.

2012 election

References

External links 
The Legislative Assembly of Alberta
Riding map from Elections Alberta

Alberta provincial electoral districts
Politics of Edmonton